Chubeh or Chubah or Chubakh may refer to:

Chubeh, Gilan
Chubeh, Qazvin